Ziba Shirazi is an Iranian-American writer, poet, singer, songwriter, storyteller and ghostwriter. As a poet and music artist, she is best known for her poignant songs and storytelling through poetry. Shirazi's compositions blend together flavors of Persian melodies with world music and jazz.

Early life and education
Shirazi grew up in Iran, surrounded by music in a family of musicians and music lovers. Her passion for performance was apparent at an early age; she started writing her own poetry at 15, and dreamed of one day becoming a performer.  In her teens she became enchanted by the American musicals, My Fair Lady and Fiddler on the Roof, featured in the movie theatres in Tehran, and later on Broadway musicals continued to be a great source of inspiration.

In 1985, Shirazi left Iran for the United States, where despite all difficulties she single-handedly produced and promoted the first of seven albums "Red Apple," in 1991. This album, which had been rejected by Iranian music producers because of its unconventional lyrics and melodies, became a sensational success soon after its launch.

Career
Referred to as the 'Voice of Women' in the Iranian community, Shirazi’s lyrics are colored by passionate feminist tones, love, compassion and universal human stories. "Obviously, I am a shameless romantic and shamelessly, a woman. The beauty that I see is abundant and joyful and always full of love, passion and sensuality, as they are my salvation."

Her collaboration with Chilean-American Jazz pianist, Dr. Jose-Miguel Yamal,  deepened the presence of jazz and Latin music in her performances. The two have performed together worldwide since 2006. As Matthew Crosier from CBC radio says, "You can expect perfect pitch voice and a top-notch band." In 2009, Shirazi created Story & Song, a lyrical storytelling performance, set to live music with video projections featuring stories of Iranian immigrants and their struggles since the Islamic Revolution.  This project, which was also the subject of Ziba's Master's thesis in Performance and Communication at California State University in Los Angeles, has been performed across the US and Canada.
In 2009, Shirazi created Story & Song, a lyrical storytelling performance, set to live music with video projections featuring stories of Iranian immigrants and their struggles since the Islamic Revolution. This project, which was also the subject of Ziba's Master's thesis in Performance and Communication at California State University in Los Angeles, has been performed across the US and Canada. Together with Dr. Kamran Afay, Ziba's thesis turned into a book, “Iranian Diaspora Identities: Stories and Songs.” published by Rowman and Littlefield, in 2020. The book contains eighteen stories and monologues of diaspora journeys that were performed by Shirazi during 2009-2019 in numerous theatres, libraries, university campuses and other venues. The stories are contextualized in two chapters that situate them in contemporary works of literature and performance on Iranian diaspora, and analyze some themes of the stories based on a model of social drama.

In 2014, Shirazi staged her first musical production, Spring Love, at the Los Angeles County Museum of Art. Spring Love celebrates the dynamic tradition of Nowruz through the story of three generations experiencing love at first sight, and debuted on stage at SOKA Performing Art Center in February 2015.

Discography
Red Apple (Sibe Sorkh) (1993)
Zananeha (1998)
Live in Concert (1999)
Seven Stars (2001)
Lost Dreams (2002)
Fresh Breeze (2005)
My Man (2011)
Bahar (2014)
Love Story (2015)

See also
 Music of Iran
 List of Iranian musicians

References

External links
 http://www.zibashirazi.com/
 https://www.youtube.com/channel/UC2l7DApUy3ZsPTfkNjL3LhA?sub_confirmation=1
 https://www.instagram.com/zibashirazi/
 https://www.facebook.com/zibashirazi
 https://artists.spotify.com/c/artist/2CMTv2W9mKOoDSBDcdyfse/profile/overview
 https://open.spotify.com/show/4T7ywl5qCl9fGoDMmaIqUj

21st-century Iranian women singers
Iranian emigrants to the United States
Living people
Year of birth missing (living people)
American writers of Iranian descent
20th-century Iranian women singers